CarbonCure Technologies is a manufacturer of carbon removal and utilization technologies that inject captured carbon dioxide into concrete. It was founded in 2012 by Rob Niven, and the company headquarters are in Halifax, Nova Scotia.

Technology 
CarbonCure holds more than 120 patents related to carbon dioxide sequestration in concrete articles.

Projects that have been made with concrete from CarbonCure's process include 725 Ponce in Atlanta.

Funding 
Investors include Sustainable Development Technology Canada, Innovacorp, GreenSoil Investments, Pangaea Ventures, Breakthrough Energy Ventures, Microsoft Climate Innovation Fund, BDC Capital, 2150, Mitsubishi Corporation, Carbon Direct, Taronga Ventures, and Amazon's Climate Pledge Fund.

Recognition 
The XPrize Foundation named CarbonCure one of two winners of the NRG COSIA Carbon Prize in April 2021. The other winner was CarbonBuilt, another carbon sequestration project.

References 

Canadian companies established in 2012
Technology companies established in 2012
Technology companies of Canada
Companies based in Halifax, Nova Scotia

External links 
LinkedIn
Twitter
UCLA CarbonBuilt